Rigoberto González González is a Mexican politician affiliated with the National Action Party. As of 2006 he served as Senator of the LIX Legislature of the Mexican Congress representing Nuevo León as replacement of Adalberto Arturo Madero Quiroga.

References

Year of birth missing (living people)
Living people
Politicians from Nuevo León
Members of the Senate of the Republic (Mexico)
National Action Party (Mexico) politicians
21st-century Mexican politicians
Autonomous University of Nuevo León alumni
University of New Mexico alumni
Academic staff of the Autonomous University of Nuevo León